Bernd Erdmann (born 23 October 1942 in Berlin) is a former German football player and manager.

Erdmann managed Tennis Borussia Berlin and SCC Berlin in the 2. Bundesliga Nord during the 1980s.

References 
 

1942 births
Living people
Footballers from Berlin
German footballers
Association football forwards
Tennis Borussia Berlin players
German football managers
Tennis Borussia Berlin managers
2. Bundesliga managers